Ali al-Khalidi - علي الخالدي  (Arabic: علي الخالدي; January 25, 1988) is an Iraqi TV host, journalist and media personality. He works at Al-Baghdadia TV.

Early life and education
Al-Khalidi was born in Basra Governorate.

Career
 "Khln Boka (Program)" on Al-Baghdadia TV 2011
 "Balbala (Program)" on Al-Baghdadia TV 2015

External links
 An Interview with Ali -YouTube
 An Interview with Ali -YouTube

References

1988 births
Living people
Iraqi journalists
Iraqi Shia Muslims
Iraqi mass media people
People from Baghdad
Iraqi television people